The women's rhythmic individual ribbon competition at the 2019 European Games was held at the Minsk-Arena on 23 June 2019.

Qualification

The top six gymnasts advanced to the final.

Final

References 

Women's rhythmic individual ribbon